Phuphena is a genus of moths of the family Noctuidae.

Species
 Phuphena cilix (Druce, 1898)
 Phuphena constricta Dognin, 1912
 Phuphena costata Schaus, 1914
 Phuphena diagona Hampson, 1908
 Phuphena fusipennis Walker, 1858
 Phuphena multilinea Schaus, 1911
 Phuphena parallela (Hampson, 1904)
 Phuphena petrovna (Schaus, 1904)
 Phuphena proseluta Schaus, 1921
 Phuphena subvenata Schaus, 1914
 Phuphena transversa (Schaus, 1894)
 Phuphena tura (Druce, 1889) (syn: Phuphena obliqua (Smith, 1900))
 Phuphena zelotypa Schaus, 1911

References
Natural History Museum Lepidoptera genus database
Phuphena at funet

Hadeninae